Henning Lohner (born 17 July 1961) is a German-American composer and filmmaker. He is best known for his film scores written as a long-standing member of Hans Zimmer’s music cooperative Remote Control Productions.

Lohner has written scores to various international films, among them The Ring Two and Incident at Loch Ness. Additionally, he has authored documentaries and art films, and has gained international recognition as creator of the Active Images media art projects.

Background and education
Born to German emigrant parents, Henning Lohner was raised near Palo Alto, California, where his father Edgar Lohner taught Comparative Literature at Stanford University and his mother  Marlene Lohner taught German Literature. Lohner has one brother, Peter, who is a lawyer turned writer-producer for film and television.

Lohner returned to Germany to study musicology, art history, and Romanic languages at Frankfurt University, from which he graduated as Master of Arts in 1987. In 1982, he took a year at the Berklee College of Music in Boston, studying Jazz Improvisation with Gary Burton and Film Scoring with Jerry Goldsmith and David Raksin. In 1985, Lohner was awarded a grant for music composition at the Centre Acanthes to study with Greek composer Iannis Xenakis, who became his lifelong mentor.

Lohner became assistant to German composer Karlheinz Stockhausen in 1984; Lohner was introduced to the visual media working on Stockhausen’s opera Licht at La Scala in Milan.  Subsequently, he worked in France in 1989 as musical advisor and assistant director to Louis Malle on the film May Fools (1990). Apprenticeships on Steve Reich’s multi-media oratorio The Cave (1990) and with Giorgio Strehler on his theater project Goethes Faust I + II (1990–1992) followed. Due to his commitment to contemporary music and avant-garde filmmaking, Frank Zappa became aware of Lohner; subsequently, Lohner collaborated with him until Zappa’s death in 1993, initializing and co-producing Zappa’s last albums The Yellow Shark (1992) and Civilization Phaze III (1993). He paid homage to Zappa with the biographical art film Peefeeyatko (1991), to which Zappa himself contributed the original score.

Lohner lives and works in Los Angeles, New York City and Berlin. He is a Visiting Professor at the Zurich University of the Arts in Switzerland. Lohner is a member of the European Film Academy and the German Film Academy.

Film scoring
In 1996, Lohner began his career as film composer in Los Angeles at Hans Zimmer’s film score company Remote Control Productions. Lohner contributed music to Broken Arrow, The Thin Red Line, and Gladiator, and provided additional composing on The Ring and Spanglish, which received a Golden Globe nomination for Best Original Score.

To date, Lohner has scored over 40 feature films, covering a variety of genres ranging from comedies such as Werner Herzog’s Incident at Loch Ness (2004), children’s animation films like Laura's Star (2004), to horror movies such as Hellraiser: Deader (2005), and family entertainment like Turtle: The Incredible Journey (2009). Regarding his music for the drama Love Comes Lately (2007), which was shown at the Toronto International Film Festival and the Sundance Film Festival, Screen International wrote, “a pleasant score with befitting Central European echoes adds to the congeniality of the proceedings.“

Often regarded as a “Hollywood composer” in the German media, Lohner does on occasion work in his home country, having scored movies by Bernd Eichinger and Til Schweiger among others. Lohner’s score for the silent film classic The Hands of Orlac premiered at the Ghent opera house in Belgium during the International Film Festival Ghent of 2001.

Lohner's music to The Ring Two received two BMI Music Awards and was nominated for the International Film Music Critics Association Awards as Best Horror Score. The Hollywood Reporter praised Lohner’s score, commenting, "An atmosphere of foreboding is aided by moody, insistent music.“

In 2012, Lohner was commissioned to rearrange the theme tune of the oldest and most watched news program on German television, Tagesschau, which caused a stir in the German media; Lohner wrote new compositions for all newscasts of the German principal public television channel Das Erste. Premiering in 2014, Lohner’s compositions received unanimously positive reviews.

Media art
Lohner’s collaboration with cinematographer Van Carlson started in 1989 with Peefeeyatko. Their artistic partnership, known as Lohner Carlson, was influenced by their collaboration with composer John Cage, which includes the art film One11 and 103 (1992) directed by Lohner, “a 90-minute black-and-white meditation on the waxing and waning of light.” Gramophone magazine called the production “a splendid project carried out with dedication by all concerned” and noted the “remarkable quality of these uniquely pure visual images, studies in light ranging from total black to total white.” Lohner paid homage to Cage posthumously with the “composed film” The Revenge of the Dead Indians, featuring artists such as Dennis Hopper, Matt Groening and Yoko Ono.

Lohner and Carlson exhibited their audio-visual composition Raw Material, Vol. 1–11 (1995) throughout Europe, for instance in The Hague, Rome and Berlin. Composed from their archive of hundreds of hours of footage, the installation was “a multi-facetted mosaic of films […] focussing on humanistic issues;” it showed interviews as well as landscapes on eleven monitors, with an equal emphasis on speech, pictures and sounds “in a new, free form of presentation,” thus generating “a type of global talk.” Subsequently, Lohner and Carlson’s Active Images developed, first shown at the Galerie Springer Berlin in 2006. According to Lohner himself, the idea “arose from our love of video photography and from our subsequent despair over the loss of these images when turning them into [an edited] film.” Presented on flat displays, the works bridge the recognizable gap between photography and narrative film and thus “blur the line between image and video.”

Lohner’s media art has been exhibited at the Centre Pompidou, the Guggenheim Museum in New York, the San Francisco Museum of Modern Art, the Calouste Gulbenkian Museum in Lisbon, the National Visual Art Gallery of Malaysia in Kuala Lumpur and the Mira Art Collection in Tokyo.

German culture reviewer Detlef Wolff has called Lohner an “unceasingly curious artist capable of looking closely, continuously able to discover the extraordinary in the seemingly ordinary.” Of an exhibition at the Erik Thomsen Gallery in 2012, a review noted that Lohner and Carlson’s work combined “the best of moving images and photographic approaches. The images are shown on a series of high resolution video panels and provide a poetic and elegant glance at seemingly normal scenes. Yet they succeed in unframing our structured visual perception of reality and moving us out of that perception box, if we look closely enough embracing a meditative patience.”

Directing
Lohner began producing and directing cultural reports for German Public Television in 1988. He has directed more than 100 short films and over 40 feature-length documentaries and teleplays, many of them portraits of influential contemporary artists such as Dennis Hopper, Benoit Mandelbrot, Gerhard Richter, Karl Lagerfeld, Brian Eno, and Abel Ferrara.

Lohner’s documentary Ninth November Night about painter Gottfried Helnwein’s installation commemorating the Reichskristallnacht, featuring Sean Penn and Maximilian Schell, premiered at the American Film Institute Festival and was shortlisted for the Academy Awards as Best Documentary Short Subject. The Malibu Times called Lohner’s film a “moving portrayal,” and the Los Angeles Times commented, “A stirring meditation on art and remembrance, Ninth November Night documents Austrian artist Gottfried Helnwein's sprawling 1988 art installation recalling the horrors of the Holocaust.”

Awards and honors
1991 Nomination & Runner-Up, 1st International Music Film Awards, Cannes, France
1994 Silver Apple Award from the National Educational Film Festival of the USA for One11 and 103
2005 Academy Award Shortlist, category: Best Documentary Short for Ninth November Night 
2005 International Film Music Critics Association Awards Nomination for The Ring Two as Best Original Score for a Horror/Thriller Film
2006 BMI Film Music Award for The Ring Two

Exhibitions as Lohner Carlson

Solo shows 
 2021: Art Break – Henning Lohner: Gerhard Richter im Atelier, Stiftung Brandenburger Tor – Max Liebermann Haus, Berlin
 2018: Galerie Hus, Paris
 2017: Felix Ringel Galerie, Düsseldorf
 2017: Ars Electronica Center, Linz
 2017: Ikono.tv, worldwide
 2015: Galerie Löhrl, Mönchengladbach
2014: RSA Antiquitäten, Wiesbaden
 2013: Egeskov Fine Arts, Copenhagen
 2013: RSA Antiquitäten, Wiesbaden
 2013: INM – Institut für Neue Medien, Frankfurt am Main
 2013: Galerie Springer, Berlin
 2012: Erik Thomsen Gallery, New York
 2012: Galerie Brachfeld, Paris (2x)
 2012: SEZ – Sport- und Erholungszentrum, Berlin
 2012: Galerie Hus, Paris
 2011: Galerie Son, Berlin
 2009: Bilirubin Gallery, Berlin
 2008: Galerie Springer & Winckler, Berlin
 2007: Galleria Traghetto, Rome
 2006: Galerie Springer & Winckler, Berlin
 1997: Goethe Institute Rome (Festival Internationale della Installazione Sonora), Rome
 1996: Pfalzgalerie, Kaiserslautern
 1996: 12th International Video & Film Festival, Kassel
 1996: World Wide Videofest, Gemeente Museum, The Hague 
 1995: Lichthaus, Bremen
 1995: Hessisches Landesmuseum, Wiesbaden
 1995: Foro Artistico in der Eisfabrik, Hannover

Group shows 
 2022: Rapture of the Deep. Film Under Water DFF – Deutsches Filminstitut & Filmmuseum, Frankfurt am Main
 2022: 10 Jahre Galerie Springer Jubiläumsausstellung, Berlin
 2018: Holocaust Memorial Day, Ikono.tv, worldwide
 2017: Art & Technology, BOZAR Musée de l'art contemporain, Brussels
 2016: Musicircus, Centre Pompidou, Metz
 2015: Alles hat seine Zeit, WimmerPlus, Prien am Chiemsee
 2014: The Vertigo of Reality, Academy of Arts, Berlin
 2014: Neither, Seventeen, London
 2014: Serpentine Cinema, Serpentine Gallery, London
 2014: Hannah Rickards Exhibit, Modern Art Oxford, Oxford
 2013: A Grammar of Subversion, Barbican Centre, London
 2012: The Freedom of Sound - John Cage Behind The Iron Curtain, Ludwig Museum of Contemporary Art, Budapest
 2012: Raum – Räume, Galerie Springer, Berlin
 2012: Dennis Hopper: The Lost Album, Martin Gropius Bau, Berlin
 2012: John Cage and ..., Museum der Moderne, Salzburg
 2012: John Cage and ..., Academy of Arts, Berlin
 2012: A House full of Music, Mathildenhöhe, Darmstadt
 2012: Sounds like Silence, Hartware Medienkunstverein, Dortmund
 2012: Warsaw Autumn, Exhibition Space of the Austrian Embassy, Warsaw
 2011: INM 20th Anniversary Exhibition, Ministry of Economics, Wiesbaden
 2011: Tendencies in Contemporary Art, Wirtschaftsforum, Berlin
 2011: Group Show Heisig – Oh – Lohner Carlson, Galerie Son, Berlin
 2010: Realismus, Kunsthal, Rotterdam
 2010: Realismus, Kunsthalle der Hypo-Kulturstiftung, Munich
 2010: Realismus, Kunsthalle Emden, Emden
 2008: Performance Art, SFMOMA, San Francisco
 2007: Tendencies in Contemporary Art, Galleria Traghetto, Venedig
 1996: National Art Gallery of Malaysia, Kuala Lumpur
 1996: Portland Art Museum, Portland, Oregon
 1995: Artist in Residence, INM – Institut für Neue Medien, Frankfurt am Main
 1995: Videofest, Podewil, Berlin
 1994: Rolywholyover a Circus, The Menil Collection, Houston
 1994: Artists of the INM, Galerie der Stadt, Sindelfingen
 1993: Rolywholyover a Circus, MOCA, Los Angeles
 1993: European Media Arts Festival, Osnabrück
 1993: Secondo Colloquio internationale di Musica Contemporanea, Palermo
 1992: 30 Years Fluxus, Kunstverein Wiesbaden, Wiesbaden
 1991: Classique en Images, La Scala, Milan
 1991: Classique en Images, Louvre, Paris

Filmography (selection)

References

External links

 LOHNER CARLSON at the Springer Gallery Berlin
 Foro Artistico: Henning Lohner
 Globart: Henning Lohner
 Variety's Who’s Who List: Composers

1961 births
Living people
German film score composers
Male film score composers
German male composers
Pupils of Karlheinz Stockhausen
Berklee College of Music alumni